<onlyinclude>

July 2017

See also

References

 07
July 2017 events in the United States